Peggy Gale Fleming (born July 27, 1948) is an American former figure skater and the only American in the 1968 Winter Olympics in Grenoble, France to bring home a Gold Medal. She is the 1968 Olympic Champion in Ladies' singles and a three-time World Champion (1966–1968). Fleming has been a television commentator in figure skating for over 20 years, including several Winter Olympic Games.

Career
Fleming was born in San Jose, California, the daughter of Doris Elizabeth (née Deal) and Albert Eugene Fleming, a newspaper journalist and former U.S. Marine. She began skating at age nine when her father took Peggy and her three sisters skating. In 1961, when Peggy was twelve years old, her coach William Kipp was killed in the crash of Sabena Flight 548 along with the rest of the United States figure skating team while en route to the 1961 World Figure Skating Championships. Fleming was subsequently coached by Carlo Fassi. Her unusual style led to five U.S. titles, three World titles and the gold medal in the 1968 Olympics in Grenoble, France.

Fleming's mother selected a color for her Grenoble skating costume, chartreuse, named after the liqueur of that color produced by neighboring Carthusians in their founding monastery, which also gives the name "chartreuse" to the region, thereby perhaps inspiring local French audience support for Peggy's virtually flawless performance. Her award in Grenoble was singularly important for the American athletes and the nation as a whole, for this was the only gold medal that the U.S. Olympic team won in the 1968 Winter Olympics. It signaled a return to American dominance in the sport of women's figure skating following the unprecedented tragedy of the 1961 Sabena plane crash.

After becoming an Olympic champion, Fleming turned professional, performed on TV shows including five NBC specials of her own and toured with many skating shows, like Ice Capades. During the Cold War, Fleming had filmed a TV show in USSR and skated to Butterfly Lovers' Violin Concerto in China. Since 1981, she has been a skating commentator for ABC Sports. In 1993, the Associated Press released results of a national sports study that ranked Fleming as the third most popular athlete in America, behind fellow Olympians Mary Lou Retton and Dorothy Hamill.

Personal life
On June 13, 1970, Fleming married her teenage sweetheart Greg Jenkins, a dermatologist and a former amateur figure skater. The couple have two sons, Andy (born in 1977) and Todd (born in 1988), and three grandchildren. They currently reside in Denver, Colorado.

Peggy Fleming was diagnosed with breast cancer in 1998. The cancer was detected in its early stages, and surgery was successful. She became a breast cancer activist who recommends not procrastinating and advocates for early detection.

Fleming and her husband owned and operated Fleming Jenkins Vineyards & Winery in California. The winery produced close to 2,000 cases of wine a year with names as "Choreography" a bordeaux-style blend from Napa Valley and a "Victories Rose" from the San Francisco Bay Syrah. Profits from the "Victories Rosé" went towards charities that supported research towards breast cancer. The winery closed in 2011.

In 1988, a Peggy Fleming all-porcelain doll was made by Franklin Mint Heirloom Porcelain Dolls. 
 
In 2007, Fleming appeared in the movie Blades of Glory as a judge.

In 2010, Art of the Olympians produced a 30-minute documentary. She is also an artist with works on display with the Art of the Olympians.

Along with former Olympian Vonetta Flowers, Fleming was injured and briefly hospitalized after a traffic accident while riding in U.S. Vice President Joe Biden's motorcade at the 2010 Winter Olympics in Vancouver.

==Performance==

Awards and honors 
ABC's Wide World of Sports Athlete of the Year, 1967
In 2003, Fleming was honored with the "Lombardi Award of Excellence" from the Vince Lombardi Cancer Foundation. The award was created to honor Coach Lombardi's legacy, and is awarded annually to an individual who exemplifies the spirit of the Coach.

See also
List of celebrities who own wineries and vineyards

References

External links

 
 
 
 
 Sixteen-year old Peggy Fleming practicing, 1965, in Los Angeles Times Photographic Archive (Collection 1429). UCLA Library Special Collections, Charles E. Young Research Library, University of California, Los Angeles.

1948 births
Living people
American female single skaters
Figure skaters at the 1964 Winter Olympics
Figure skaters at the 1968 Winter Olympics
Figure skating commentators
Olympic figure skaters of the United States
Olympic Games broadcasters
Olympic gold medalists for the United States in figure skating
Figure skaters from San Jose, California
Women sports announcers
World Figure Skating Championships medalists
Medalists at the 1968 Winter Olympics
Colorado College alumni
21st-century American women